The 2006 Setanta Sports Cup was the 2nd staging of the cross-border cup competition that takes place between football clubs from the Republic of Ireland and Northern Ireland. The final was played at Tolka Park in Dublin, Republic of Ireland on 22 April 2006, where Drogheda United beat Cork City to win the competition for the first time.

Group stage
The draw for this round was held 12 December 2005.  The matches were played 20 February 2006 – 3 April 2006.

Group A

Group B

Semi-finals
The draw for the semi-finals was made by drawing the winners of Group A against the runners-up of Group B and vice versa, with group winners having home advantage. There would be no replays if the matches were drawn; instead, extra time would decide winners immediately thereafter. If extra time did not decide the winners, a set of five alternating penalty kicks would decide winners.

Final
Similarly to the semi-finals, there would be no replay even if the match was drawn; instead, extra time would be used to decide the winners. If extra time failed to separate the two sides, the match would go to penalties.

Goalscorers
4 goals
  Denis Behan (Cork City)
  Peter Thompson (Linfield)

3 goals

  Jason Byrne (Shelbourne)
  George O'Callaghan (Cork City)
  Paul McAreavey (Linfield)
  Declan O'Brien (Drogheda United)

2 goals

  Glen Crowe (Shelbourne)
  Sean Hargan (Derry City)
  Oran Kearney (Linfield)
  Mark Leech (Drogheda United)
  John O'Flynn (Cork City)

1 goal

  Timmy Adamson (Dungannon Swifts)
  Shane Barrett (Drogheda United)
  Gary Beckett (Derry City)
  Stephen Bradley (Drogheda United)
  Gary Browne (Glentoran)
  David Bulow (Dungannon Swifts)
  Ollie Cahill (Shelbourne)
  John Convery (Portadown)
  Mark Farren (Derry City)
  Neale Fenn (Cork City)
  Michael Gault (Linfield)
  Andrew Hunter (Linfield)
  James Keddy (Drogheda United)
  Paul Keegan (Drogheda United)
  Darren Kelly (Portadown)
  Darren Lockhart (Glentoran)
  Ciarán Martyn (Derry City)
  Rodney McAree (Dungannon Swifts)
  Henry McStay (Portadown)
  William Murphy (Linfield)
  Colin Nixon (Glentoran)
  Colin O'Brien (Cork City)
  Paddy Quinn (Portadown)
  Jamie Reed (Glentoran)
  Bobby Ryan (Shelbourne)
  David Scullion (Dungannon Swifts)
  Chris Walker (Glentoran)
  Billy Woods (Cork City)

1 own goal
  Jason Gavin (Drogheda United)

External links
 2006 Setanta Cup on fai.ie
 2006 Setanta Cup on rsssf.com

2006
1
Set